Dimensional Markup language (DML) is an XML format definition tailored to the needs of dimensional results for Discrete manufacturing.  The purpose is to haul the results between applications that generate or use dimensional information.

A typical scenario is where an inspection device collects dimensional data and sends the information to an SPC package for process analysis or a database for long term storage.

If properly used, DML can be extremely useful by enabling once disparate systems to work together easily.
This document describes the fundamentals of a well formatted DML data set.

Sources
https://web.archive.org/web/20110710141257/http://www.dmisstandard.com/DML/

XML markup languages